The Bloomsburg–Berwick Metropolitan Statistical Area (MSA), as defined by the United States Census Bureau, is an area consisting of two counties in Pennsylvania, anchored by the town of Bloomsburg and the borough of Berwick. As of the 2010 census, the MSA had a population of 85,562 (though a July 1, 2013 estimate placed the population at 85,338).

Counties
Columbia
Montour

Communities

Towns
Bloomsburg (Principal city)

Boroughs
Ashland (partial)
Benton
Berwick (Principal city)
Briar Creek
Catawissa
Centralia
Danville
Millville
Orangeville
Stillwater
Washingtonville

Census-designated places
Note: All census-designated places are unincorporated.

Unincorporated places
Mexico

Townships

Columbia County

Montour County
Anthony Township
Cooper Township
Derry Township
Liberty Township
Limestone Township
Mahoning Township
Mayberry Township
Valley Township
West Hemlock Township

Combined Statistical Area (CSA)
The United States Office of Management and Budget has also designated the area the Bloomsburg–Berwick–Sunbury, PA Combined Statistical Area (CSA). As of the 2010 U.S. Census the combined area ranked 8th most populous in the State of Pennsylvania and the 115th most populous in the United States with a population of 264,739.

Counties in Combined Statistical Area
Columbia
Montour
Northumberland
Snyder
Union

Demographics
As of the census of 2000, there were 82,387 people, 32,000 households, and 21,385 families residing within the MSA. The racial makeup of the μSA was 97.38% White, 0.85% African American, 0.13% Native American, 0.69% Asian, 0.03% Pacific Islander, 0.34% from other races, and 0.58% from two or more races. Hispanic or Latino of any race were 0.94% of the population.

The median income for a household in the MSA was $36,085, and the median income for a family was $43,311. Males had a median income of $31,442 versus $22,707 for females. The per capita income for the μSA was $22,707.

See also
Pennsylvania census statistical areas

References

 
Populated places in Columbia County, Pennsylvania
Populated places in Montour County, Pennsylvania